Gerold Löffler (born 26 January 1967) is a Swiss bobsledder who competed in the early 1990s. Competing in two Winter Olympics, he earned his best finish of fifth in the four-man event at Albertville in 1992.

References
 1992 bobsleigh four-man results
 1994 bobsleigh four-man results

1967 births
Bobsledders at the 1992 Winter Olympics
Bobsledders at the 1994 Winter Olympics
Living people
Swiss male bobsledders
Olympic bobsledders of Switzerland